"Fast Times" is a song recorded by American singer Sabrina Carpenter from her fifth studio album Emails I Can't Send (2022), included as the tenth track of the album. The track was written by Carpenter, Julia Michaels, JP Saxe and its producer John Ryan. The song was released by Island Records as the second single of the album on February 18, 2022.

Background and release 
The song was written by Carpenter, Julia Michaels, JP Saxe and John Ryan in New York on Summer 2021. The first stage of the song's songwriting was sampling a Tequila bottle and playing percussion with pencils. The singer says "We weren't taking ourselves too seriously making it, which really reflects the energy of the song".

On January 1, Carpenter shares a snippet of the song's chorus, enticing new music. On The Tonight Show Starring Jimmy Fallon, Carpenter revealed the song’s name.  On February 3, Carpenter finally reveals the single's cover art and release date. The song was released on February 18, along with its music video.

Composition and lyrical interpretation
Musically, "Fast Times" is a two minutes and fifty-five seconds uptempo pop song with elements of chamber pop and disco. In terms of music notation, "Fast Times" was composed using  common time in the key of C♯ minor, with the verses composed in D major, with a moderately fast tempo of 133 beats per minute. The song follows the chord progression of Em-Em6-Em7-Em6 on the verses and C♯m-B6-Amaj7-B6/A on the chorus. Carpenter's vocal range spans from the low note G3 to the high note of A4, giving the song one octave and one note of range. Productionwise, the song features "post-disco violins" and a "funky electric guitar solo" on the bridge.

Music video
The official music video was released along with the song and was directed by Amber Park. The action music video is inspired by Charlie’s Angels and Kill Bill.

Credits and personnel 
Recording and management
Recorded at Jungle City Studios (New York City)
Mixed at MixStar Studios (Virginia Beach, Virginia)
Mastered at Sterling Sound (Edgewater, New Jersey)
Sabalicious Songs (BMI), Music of Big Family/Don Wyan Music (BMI), administered by Hipgnosis Songs Group, Good Deal Publishing (BMI), administered by Songs of Universal, Inc., Music By Work of Art (BMI)/Modern Arts Songs (BMI)/Songs of Starker Saxe (BMI)/Starkersaxesongs (SOCAN), administered by Sony/ATV Songs LLC (BMI)

Personnel

 Sabrina Carpenter – lead vocals, songwriting, backing vocals
 John Ryan – songwriting, production, recording, bass, guitar, drums, percussion, keyboards, backing vocals
 Julia Michaels – songwriting
 JP Saxe – songwriting
 Peter Lee Johnson - strings
 Serban Ghenea – mixing
 Bryce Bordone – assistant mix engineer
 Chris Gehringer – mastering

Credits adapted from Emails I Can't Send liner notes.

Release history

References 

2022 songs
2022 singles
Songs written by Julia Michaels
Sabrina Carpenter songs
Island Records singles
Songs written by Sabrina Carpenter
Songs written by John Ryan (musician)
Songs written by JP Saxe